Roberts House, Roberts Homestead, Roberts Farm, or variations, may refer to:

in the United States
(by state then city)
Petty-Roberts-Beatty House, Clayton, Alabama, listed on the NRHP in Alabama
Roberts House (Mobile, Alabama), listed on the NRHP in Alabama
Roberts House (Prescott, Arizona), listed on the NRHP in Arizona
Roberts Farm Historic and Archeological District, Tallahassee, Florida, NRHP-listed
Roberts Ranch, Immokalee, Florida, NRHP-listed
House at 7306 St. Augustine Road, Jacksonville, Florida, also known as the Roberts House, NRHP-listed
Alfred W. Roberts House, Ball Ground, Georgia, listed on the NRHP in Georgia
Hitchcock-Roberts House, Monticello, Georgia, listed on the NRHP in Georgia
Col. William T. Roberts House, Douglasville, Georgia, listed on the NRHP in Georgia
John Spencer Roberts House, Columbus, Georgia, listed on the NRHP in Georgia
Isaac Roberts House, Sandy Springs, Georgia, listed on the NRHP in Georgia
Hitchcock-Roberts House, Monticello, Georgia, listed on the NRHP in Georgia
Roberts-McGregor House, Warrenton, Georgia, listed on the NRHP in Georgia
William H. Roberts House, Pecatonica, Illinois, listed on the NRHP in Illinois
Roberts-Morton House, Newburgh, Indiana, listed on the NRHP in Indiana
Edward C. Roberts House, Davenport, Iowa, NRHP-listed
Roberts Octagon Barn, Sharon Center, Iowa, listed on the NRHP in Iowa
John N. Roberts House, Lawrence, Kansas, listed on the NRHP in Kansas
Wesley Roberts House, Cynthiana, Kentucky, listed on the NRHP in Kentucky
Earl Roberts House, Colfax, Louisiana, listed on the NRHP in Louisiana
Sargent-Roberts House, Bangor, Maine, listed on the NRHP in Maine
Littlefield-Roberts House, Cambridge, Massachusetts, listed on the NRHP in Massachusetts
Roberts House (Reading, Massachusetts), listed on the NRHP in Massachusetts
Martin W. Roberts House, Kalamazoo, Michigan, listed on the NRHP in Michigan
Jones-Roberts Farmstead, Lake Crystal, Minnesota, listed on the NRHP in Minnesota
J. F. Roberts Octagonal Barn, Rea, Missouri, listed on the NRHP in Missouri
Foreman-Roberts House Carson City, Nevada, listed on the NRHP in Nevada
W. C. Record House, also known as Roberts House, Winnemucca, Nevada, NRHP-listed
Judge Nathan S. Roberts House, Canastota, New York, listed on the NRHP in New York
Roberts Hall (Ithaca, New York), listed on the NRHP in New York
Eure-Roberts House, Gatesville, North Carolina, listed on the NRHP in North Carolina
Roberts-Carter House, Gatesville, North Carolina, listed on the NRHP in North Carolina
Holden-Roberts Farm, Hillsborough, North Carolina, listed on the NRHP in North Carolina
Roberts-Justice House, Kernersville, North Carolina, listed on the NRHP in North Carolina
Roberts-Vaughan House, Murfreesboro, North Carolina, listed on the NRHP in North Carolina
Roberts House (Canonsburg, Pennsylvania), listed on the NRHP in Pennsylvania
Roberts Farm Site, Conestoga, Pennsylvania, listed on the NRHP in Pennsylvania
Strickland-Roberts Homestead, Kimberton, Pennsylvania, listed on the NRHP in Pennsylvania
Roberts-Quay House, Philadelphia, Pennsylvania, listed on the NRHP in Philadelphia, Pennsylvania
Enoch Roberts House, Quakertown, Pennsylvania, listed on the NRHP in Pennsylvania
Nathan J. and Nancy Roberts House, Abilene, Texas, listed on the NRHP in Texas
Dr. Rufus A. Roberts House, Cedar Hill, Texas, listed on the NRHP in Texas
Sheeks-Robertson House, Austin, Texas, listed on the NRHP in Texas
B. H. Roberts, Louisa Smith and Cecilia Dibble, House, Centerville, Utah, listed on the NRHP in Utah
William D. Roberts House, Provo, Utah, listed on the NRHP in Utah
Roberts House (Barneveld, Wisconsin), listed on the NRHP in Wisconsin

See also
Robertson House (disambiguation)
Roberts Building (disambiguation)
Roberts Chapel (disambiguation) 
Roberts County Courthouse (disambiguation)